Split Your Lip is the eighth studio album by Swedish hard rock band Hardcore Superstar. The album was released in Sweden on 26 November 2010, and in the United Kingdom on 29 November 2010.

Track listing

Personnel
Jocke Berg: Vocals
Vic Zino: Guitars
Martin Sandvik: Bass and vocals
Magnus "Adde" Andreasson: Drums

Charts

References

2010 albums
Hardcore Superstar albums